Diego Junqueira was the defending champion, but he chose to not participate this year.
Oleksandr Dolgopolov Jr. defeated Juan-Martín Aranguren 7–5, 7–6(5) in the final.

Seeds

Draw

Final four

Top half

Bottom half

References
 Main Draw
 Qualifying Draw

Citta di Como Challenger - Singles
Città di Como Challenger